Afton is an unincorporated community in northern Dickens County, Texas, United States.

History
A post office was established in the community under the name Beckton in 1893, and the name was changed to Afton in 1900. The present name is derived from the poem Sweet Afton by Robert Burns.

Education
The Patton Springs Independent School District serves area students.

Notable people
Saddlemaker Charles Weldon Cannon was born in Afton in 1915.
American Country Music artist Trent Willmon was raised on a ranch near Afton.

See also
Battle of Pease River
Little Red River
Pease River
Quitaque Creek
Salt Fork Brazos River
Washita River
Wichita River

References

External links

Unincorporated communities in Texas
Unincorporated communities in Dickens County, Texas